This article lists the winners and nominees for the NAACP Image Award for Outstanding Comedy Series. This category was first awarded during the 1988 ceremony and since its inception, Black-ish holds the records for most wins with six.

Winners and nominees
Winners are listed first and highlighted in bold.

1980s

1990s

2000s

2010s

2020s

Multiple wins and nominations

Wins

 6 wins
 Black-ish
 5 wins
 Tyler Perry's House of Payne
 3 wins
 The Bernie Mac Show
 The Steve Harvey Show

 2 wins
 Cosby
 Insecure
 Living Single
 Martin
 Muppet Babies

Nominations

 8 nominations 
 Black-ish

 7 nominations
 Girlfriends

 6 nominations
 The Bernie Mac Show

 5 nominations
 Everybody Hates Chris
 Insecure
 The Steve Harvey Show
 Tyler Perry's House of Payne

 4 nominations
 30 Rock
 The Game
 Martin
 Modern Family
 My Wife and Kids
 Ugly Betty
 Fresh Prince of Bel-Air

 3 nominations
 Cosby

 Dear White People
 Glee
 Grown-ish
 Half & Half
 House of Lies
 Living Single
 Moesha
 The Hughleys
 Survivor's Remorse

 2 nominations
 Ballers
 For Your Love
 Key & Peele
 Muppet Babies
 Orange Is the New Black
 Real Husbands of Hollywood
 Sister, Sister
 The Cosby Show
 The Jamie Foxx Show
 The Parkers
 The Soul Man

References

NAACP Image Awards
American comedy and humor awards